The 2018 Rally Sweden (formally known as the Rally Sweden 2018) was a motor racing event for rally cars that was held over four days between 15 and 18 February 2018. It marked the sixty-sixth running of Rally Sweden, and was the second round of the 2018 World Rally Championship and its support categories, the WRC-2 and WRC-3 championships. It was also the first round of the Junior World Rally Championship.

Jari-Matti Latvala and Miikka Anttila were the defending rally winners. Thierry Neuville and Nicolas Gilsoul were the rally winners. Their team, Hyundai Shell Mobis WRT, were the manufacturers' winners. The Belgian also became only the third non-Nordic driver to win the event after the nine-time world champion, Sébastien Loeb, and the defending world champion, Sébastien Ogier. The Tommi Mäkinen Racing crew of Takamoto Katsuta and Marko Salminen won the World Rally Championship-2 category in a Ford Fiesta R5, while Swedish crew Denis Rådström and Johan Johansson won the World Rally Championship-3 and Junior World Rally Championship.

Background

Championship standings prior to the event
Sébastien Ogier and Julien Ingrassia entered the round with an eight-point lead in the World Championships for Drivers and Co-drivers. In the World Championship for Manufacturers, M-Sport Ford WRT and Toyota Gazoo Racing WRT held a fifteen-point lead over Citroën Total Abu Dhabi WRT.

Entry list
The following crews were entered into the rally. The event was open to crews competing in the World Rally Championship, World Rally Championship-2, World Rally Championship-3 and Junior World Rally Championships. The final entry list consisted of fourteen World Rally Car entries, fifteen in the World Rally Championship-2, and fifteen entries in the World Rally Championship-3, twelve of which were eligible to score points in the Junior World Rally Championship.

Notes
 — Driver is eligible to score points in the FIA Junior World Rally Championship.

Route

Itenerary

Report

Thursday
Ott Tänak drove a Yaris, defeated Thierry Neuville in their head-to-head heat on snow roads and stopped the clocks 0.3 second faster than Latvala, who beat Mads Østberg in their battle by 0.3 second. The Norwegian was impressive on his Citroën C3 debut to hold third as competitors headed north to Torsby for an overnight halt. Kris Meeke, driving another C3, and Hyundai i20 pilot Andreas Mikkelsen were tied in fourth, a further 0.3 second behind, while Neuville completed the top six. Toyota's Esapekka Lappi and championship leader Sébastien Ogier lost time after running wide on the same corner near the finish. They were eighth and ninth respectively but just 2.9 seconds off the pace.

Friday
The early starters lost time ploughing a clean route through fresh snow. Championship leader Sébastien Ogier was the first on the road. He was struggle with the grip all day and conceded almost three minutes en route to twelfth. So were Ott Tänak and Jari-Matti Latvala. The Toyota teammates separated by eighth and ninth. Craig Breen was third on the board, and the Irishman was delighted with his form with two afternoon stages wins. Teammate Mads Østberg was 0.5 second further back. Lying sixth after last night's curtain-raising speed test, Thierry Neuville moved his i20 to the front on this morning's second stage and held off a chasing pack which had the advantage of better conditions. Norwegian Andreas Mikkelsen, who started further behind, had a trouble-free day while Hayden Paddon running out of the top three to make Hyundai 1-2-3.

Saturday

Thierry Neuville was the rally leader, but the gap between him and his main opponent was not big enough, especially for the Citroën driver, Craig Breen, who was eager to claim his first WRC victory. The Irish driver have once narrowed the gap to less than five seconds. However, the Hyundai star set four fastest stage times to build a 22.7-second lead, though he suffered a paddle shift gearchange system issue at the opening stage. Teammate Andreas Mikkelsen finished third after a spin today which made him dropped from second to fourth place, 9.3 seconds behind Breen. Hayden Paddon's car set-up was unsuited to this morning's forest roads. The New Zealander stuck on the inside of a hairpin in the final stage, which made him lost some time. He ended the day 16.6 seconds behind Mikkelsen. Mads Østberg changed his C3's settings to improve his car's balance but the switches affected his confidence and he reversed the adjustments. There was also an accident in SS13. Kris Meeke nosed into a snow bank but lost engine power when he regained the road. He stopped to clean snow from his Citroën's cooling system and as Ott Tänak tried to overtake in a narrow section, the two cars collided and the Estonian's Toyota Yaris bounced into a ditch. That ended with the Briton's retirement and made five-time world champion Sébastien Ogier finally get into the top ten.

Sunday
With a comfortable lead, Thierry Neuville finally eased through Sunday's final three speed tests to head Ireland's Craig Breen, driving a Citroën C3, for whom second was a career-best result. Andreas Mikkelsen finished third after a spun at exactly the same point as Neuville. Esapekka Lappi fought back and gained two places in the final three stages to finish fourth, 17.5 seconds adrift of Mikkelsen, after he plunged down the order after burying his Toyota Yaris in a snow bank. A final stage mistake from Hayden Paddon cost him a place. The Kiwi stalled his i20 a couple of kilometres from the finish and trailed the Finn by 8.6 seconds. After only a day's pre-event testing, Mads Østberg was sixth on his debut drive in a C3. Jari-Matti Latvala finished seventh after being delayed by a troublesome front differential and adverse road conditions. Fellow Finn Teemu Suninen was eighth in a Ford Fiesta, the highest place among M-Sport World Rally Team drivers. Ott Tänak and Monte-Carlo winner Sébastien Ogier dropped lot of time in Friday's opening leg as they ploughed a path through deep snow. They were unable to regain lost ground and finished ninth and tenth respectively.

Results

World Rally Championship

Classification

Special stages

Championship standings

World Rally Championship-2

Classification

Special stages

Championship standings

World Rally Championship-3

Classification

Special stages

Championship standings

Junior World Rally Championship

Classification

Special stages

Championship standings

Notes

References

External links

  
 2018 Rally Sweden in e-wrc website
 The official website of the World Rally Championship

2018
Sweden
2018 in Swedish motorsport
February 2018 sports events in Sweden